Rehal is a surname and may refer to:

Navtej Singh Rehal, lead singer in Bombay Rockers
Joseph E. Rehal, Businessman 
Saiful Rehal, Eighth Sultan of Brunei

See also
Rahal (disambiguation)
Rahal clan

Surnames